The 29th British Academy Film Awards, given by the British Academy of Film and Television Arts in 1976, honoured the best films of 1975.

Winners and nominees
BAFTA Fellowship: Charlie Chaplin and Laurence Olivier

Statistics

See also
 48th Academy Awards
 1st César Awards
 28th Directors Guild of America Awards
 33rd Golden Globe Awards
 2nd Saturn Awards
 28th Writers Guild of America Awards

Film029
1975 film awards
1976 in British cinema
1975 awards in the United Kingdom